Ōmokoroa is a small urban area in the Western Bay of Plenty District of New Zealand. The suburb is considered part of Greater Tauranga (contributing towards its population of ), and is within the Coromandel electorate. Ōmokoroa began as a small rural holiday village, but is expanding to be a commuter town, with a 25-minute drive to Tauranga City.

Ōmokoroa urban area had a population of 3210 as of 2018, and is designated as an area of special housing growth. With the rural area to the south, it is expected to reach a population of 12,000 by 2020–2030, and is situated within the Kaimai Ward, Western Bay of Plenty. Ōmokoroa includes the urban area on the harbour side of State Highway 2, along with Youngson Road to Plummers Point Road, and parts of Old Highway Road.

Demographics
Ōmokoroa statistical area corresponds to the more built-up northern part of the peninsula, separated from the more rural area to the south by the East Coast Main Trunk.

Ōmokoroa had a population of 3,210 at the 2018 New Zealand census, an increase of 876 people (37.5%) since the 2013 census, and an increase of 1,242 people (63.1%) since the 2006 census. There were 1,314 households, comprising 1,533 males and 1,677 females, giving a sex ratio of 0.91 males per female. The median age was 58.0 years (compared with 37.4 years nationally), with 507 people (15.8%) aged under 15 years, 237 (7.4%) aged 15 to 29, 1,182 (36.8%) aged 30 to 64, and 1,287 (40.1%) aged 65 or older.

Ethnicities were 95.0% European/Pākehā, 7.3% Māori, 0.8% Pacific peoples, 2.0% Asian, and 1.5% other ethnicities. People may identify with more than one ethnicity.

The percentage of people born overseas was 24.9, compared with 27.1% nationally.

Although some people chose not to answer the census's question about religious affiliation, 48.3% had no religion, 42.9% were Christian, 0.6% had Māori religious beliefs, 0.1% were Hindu, 0.2% were Muslim, 0.3% were Buddhist and 1.0% had other religions.

Of those at least 15 years old, 567 (21.0%) people had a bachelor's or higher degree, and 453 (16.8%) people had no formal qualifications. The median income was $29,200, compared with $31,800 nationally. 453 people (16.8%) earned over $70,000 compared to 17.2% nationally. The employment status of those at least 15 was that 903 (33.4%) people were employed full-time, 369 (13.7%) were part-time, and 51 (1.9%) were unemployed.

Rural surrounds

Ōmokoroa Rural had a population of 744 at the 2018 New Zealand census, an increase of 105 people (16.4%) since the 2013 census, and an increase of 48 people (6.9%) since the 2006 census. There were 279 households, comprising 357 males and 384 females, giving a sex ratio of 0.93 males per female. The median age was 48.8 years (compared with 37.4 years nationally), with 132 people (17.7%) aged under 15 years, 114 (15.3%) aged 15 to 29, 345 (46.4%) aged 30 to 64, and 150 (20.2%) aged 65 or older.

Ethnicities were 93.1% European/Pākehā, 10.9% Māori, 1.2% Pacific peoples, 1.2% Asian, and 2.0% other ethnicities. People may identify with more than one ethnicity.

The percentage of people born overseas was 15.7, compared with 27.1% nationally.

Although some people chose not to answer the census's question about religious affiliation, 50.0% had no religion, 36.3% were Christian, 0.4% had Māori religious beliefs, 0.4% were Hindu, 0.4% were Buddhist and 2.8% had other religions.

Of those at least 15 years old, 120 (19.6%) people had a bachelor's or higher degree, and 78 (12.7%) people had no formal qualifications. The median income was $34,800, compared with $31,800 nationally. 114 people (18.6%) earned over $70,000 compared to 17.2% nationally. The employment status of those at least 15 was that 276 (45.1%) people were employed full-time, 141 (23.0%) were part-time, and 12 (2.0%) were unemployed.

Communication

The postcodes for the area are:
3114  – Railway line to harbour edge
3172  – Railway line towards SH2 

The dialing prefix(es) for the town are
(+64) 7 548

Education

The nearest zoned secondary schools in the area are Otumoetai College, Tauranga Boys' College and Tauranga Girls' College. Katikati College and the private Bethlehem College are also nearby.

References

External links
Community website

Western Bay of Plenty District
Populated places in the Bay of Plenty Region
Populated places around the Tauranga Harbour